Thomas Johnston Taylor, Baron Taylor of Gryfe FRSE DL LLD (27 April 1912 – 13 July 2001) was a British politician and businessman. He was affectionately known as Tom Taylor.

Personal life
Taylor was born in Glasgow on 27 April 1912. His father, John Sharp Taylor, was an Independent Labour Party Member. He died when Tom was three years old and was raised with his two siblings by his mother from that time.

He was educated at Bellahouston Academy. He left school in 1914 and his first job was as an office boy in the Scottish Co-operative Wholesale Society. He was later their Chairman.

In 1931 a scholarship led to his living in Germany, where he also returned later in his youth. In 1931 he was a member of the German Young Socialists but was opposed the rise of the Nazi Party. During the Second World War he was a conscientious objector. Taylor later became a Quaker.

In 1977 he was elected a Fellow of the Royal Society of Edinburgh. His proposers were Alick Buchanan-Smith, Baron Balerno, Robert Allan Smith, Donald McCallum and Sir David Lowe.

He died on 13 July 2001.

Family

He was married in 1943 to Isobel Wands and had two daughters: Jill and Joyce.

Political career
As a young man Taylor was a member of the Independent Labour Party, and was elected to Glasgow City Council in 1934 as the city's youngest ever councillor. He stood for the ILP as a parliamentary candidate in the 1941 Edinburgh Central by-election. He later joined the Labour Party, then the Social Democratic Party (SDP) and the Owenite 'continuing' SDP, before returning to Labour in 1990.

Taylor opposed Scottish devolution. Although an opponent of the Government's Railways Bill in 1993, he noted that he had no objection to privatisation as a concept.

On 29 January 1968 he was created a life peer as Baron Taylor of Gryfe, of Bridge of Weir in the County of Renfrew. From then he had a seat in the House of Lords.

Outside politics
Taylor served as President of the Co-operative Wholesale Society in Scotland and chaired the UK Forestry Commission. From 1971 to 1980, he was chairman of Scottish Railways and a number of other companies, including twelve years as the chairman of Morgan Grenfell Scotland.

References

 Guardian obituary 
Who's Who 2000

2001 deaths
1912 births
Independent Labour Party National Administrative Committee members
Social Democratic Party (UK) life peers
Social Democratic Party (UK, 1988) peers
Labour Party (UK) life peers
British Rail people
Conscientious objectors
Life peers created by Elizabeth II
British Quakers
Scottish Quakers
Quakers